Band of Brothers is the ninth solo studio album by guitarist Brian Tarquin, released on July 7, 2017, by Cleopatra Records. It peaked #21 on the Metal Contraband Radio charts September 2017. All tracks were recorded at Tarquin's Jungle Room Studios in Merritt Island, Florida and first predominantly vocal album recorded by Brian. Tarquin composed and produced the songs especially for military veterans along with singer Phil Naro from Billy Sheehan’s band Talas. It features guest appearances by singer Jeff Scott Soto (Journey, Trans-Siberian Orchestra), Steve Morse (Deep Purple), Ron 'Bumblefoot' Thal (ex-Guns N' Roses), Trey Gunn (King Crimson), Jeff Watson (Night Ranger), Joel Hoekstra (Whitesnake), Gary Hoey, Tony Franklin (Jimmy Page, Blue Murder) and Tina Guo (Al Di Meola). Partial proceeds from the sales go to the Fisher House Foundation, who supplies housing to veterans' families while they are hospitalized.

Track listing

Personnel
Brian Tarquin – rhythm, melody & solo guitars & bass on tracks 1, 2, 3, 5, 6,  
Reggie Pryor – drums
Rick Mullen – bass (tracks 4, 7, 8, 10)
Joel Hoekstra – guest guitar solo (1)
Ron "Bumblefoot" Thal – guest guitar solo (track 2)
Jeff Watson – guest guitar solo (track 3)
Jeff Scott Soto – vocals (track 4)
Phil Naro – vocals (tracks 1, 2, 3, 5, 6, 8, 9)
Tina Guo – electric cello (track 5)
Steve Morse – guest guitar solo (track 6)
Gary Hoey – guest guitar solo (track 7)
Tony Franklin – fretless bass (tracks 9)
Brian Tarquin – mix engineer, producer
Additional vocal recording by Frank Tassone 
David Glasser of Airshow & Geoff Gray – mastering engineers
Eric Christian – photography
Miss M and Brian Tarquin – graphic design

References 

 
 
 

2017 albums
Brian Tarquin albums